Football at the 2015 Southeast Asian Games was held at Singapore National Stadium, Jalan Besar Stadium and Bishan Stadium, Singapore from 29 May to 15 June 2015. Medals were awarded in one event for men's competitions. There were match-fixing scandals involving East Timor team with several other teams.

In contrast to the previous editions, the organisers decided to not include a women's tournament in this edition.

Venues
Three football stadiums were hosted matches of the football competition:

Participating nations
A total of 220 athletes from 11 nations competed in football at the 2015 Southeast Asian Games:

Draw
The draw for the tournament was held on 15 April 2015.

Squads

Competition schedule
The following was the competition schedule for the football competitions:

Medal summary

Medal table

Medalists

Results
All times listed are UTC+8

Preliminary round

Group A

Group B

Knockout round

Semi-finals

Bronze medal match

Gold medal match

Winners

Final standing

Goalscorers
5 goals

 Sithu Aung
 Chananan Pombuppha
 Võ Huy Toàn

4 goals

 Evan Dimas
 Mạc Hồng Quân

3 goals

 Chan Vathanaka
 Keo Sokpheng
 Muchlis Hadi
 Nay Lin Tun
 Rungrath Poomchantuek
 Thitipan Puangchan
 Nguyễn Công Phượng

2 goals

 Prak Mony Udom
 Ahmad Noviandani
 Phoutthasay Khochalern
 Soukchinda Natphasouk
 Syahrul Azwari Ibrahim
 Kyaw Zin Lwin
 Shine Thura
 Faris Ramli
 Chenrop Samphaodi
 Narubadin Weerawatnodom
 Nurul Sriyankem
 Tristan Do
 Lê Thanh Bình
 Quế Ngọc Hải
 Trần Phi Sơn

1 goal

 Azwan Ali Rahman
 Faiq Jefri Bolkiah
 Abduh Lestaluhu
 Wawan Febrianto
 Bounthavy Sipasong
 Khonesavanh Sihavong
 Adam Nor Azlin
 D. Saarvindran
 Muhammad Syafiq Ahmad
 Nurridzuan Abu Hassan
 Saiful Ridzuwan Selamat
 Kaung Sat Naing
 Thiha Zaw
 Ye Ko Oo
 Ye Win Aung
 Paolo Salenga
 Shirmar Felongco
 Safirul Sulaiman
 Sahil Suhaimi
 Sheikh Abdul Hadi
 Chanathip Songkrasin
 Pakorn Prempak
 Pinyo Inpinit
 Sarach Yooyen
 Tanaboon Kesarat
 Frangcyatma Alves
 Henrique Cruz
 Jairo Neto
 Paulo Helber
 Nguyễn Hữu Dũng
 Nguyễn Thanh Hiền
 Nguyễn Văn Toàn
 Phạm Đức Huy
 Phạm Mạnh Hùng

Match-fixing
On 6 November 2015, Timor Leste's Technical director Orlando Marques Henriques Mendes and former international player Moisés Natalino De Jesus were sentenced to 24 months and 20 months imprisonment respectively for offences related to football match-fixing activities. A Singaporean match-fixer Rajendran R Kurusamy had agreed to pay S$15k should Timor Leste to lose their opening game against Malaysia. Rajendran and Indonesian accomplice Nasiruddin pleaded guilty as well and were sentenced to 48 and 30 months’ jail respectively.

References

External links
 

 
Kallang
Bishan, Singapore